Michael McAvoy (1871 – 1950) was a Scottish footballer who played as a left half, featuring for Darwen in England's Football League (making the move south along with Robert Maxwell), then for St Mirren and Abercorn in the Scottish Football League. He made over 300 appearances for St Mirren over 13 years with the Paisley club, including the 1908 Scottish Cup Final, a defeat at the hands of Celtic – after four losses at the semi-final stage of the competition in previous years.

References

1871 births
1950 deaths
Date of birth unknown
Date of death unknown
Scottish footballers
Footballers from Kilmarnock
English Football League players
Scottish Football League players
Association football wing halves
Darwen F.C. players
St Mirren F.C. players
Abercorn F.C. players